Erving may refer to:

People
 Cameron Erving (born 1992), American college football player
 George W. Erving (1769–1850), American diplomat
 Julius Erving (born 1950), American basketball player, also known as "Dr. J"
 Erving Goffman (1922–1982), Canadian sociologist and writer
 Erving Walker (born 1990), American basketball player
 Joona Erving (born 1994), Finnish hockey player

Places
 Erving, Massachusetts
 Erving Township, Jewell County, Kansas
 Erving State Forest, located in Erving, Warwick, and Orange, Massachusetts

See also
 Earvin
 Ervin (disambiguation)
 Ervine
 Erwan
 Erwin (disambiguation)
 Irvin
 Irvine (disambiguation)
 Irving (disambiguation)
 Irwin (disambiguation)